Beauty and the Beast: The Enchanted Christmas is a 1997 direct-to-video animated Christmas musical fantasy film produced by Walt Disney Television Animation. It is a follow-up to the 1991 Disney animated film Beauty and the Beast. The film sold 7.6million VHS tapes in 1997. This is the first of two sequels to Beauty and the Beast that were released, with the other being Belle's Magical World (1998).

Plot

A Christmas party is held at the Beast's castle sometime after the enchantress's spell is broken, attended by almost the entire village. While reminiscing about the previous year's Christmas, Lumiere and Cogsworth get into an argument over who "saved" Christmas, prompting Mrs. Potts to tell the story.

One year ago, not long after the Beast saved Belle from the wolves, Belle anticipates the coming Christmas season, as do the other servants, though they reveal that the Prince is against the season since that’s when he was transformed into a Beast and the enchanted rose was put under the bell jar on Christmas Eve. To lighten his spirit, Belle teaches the Beast how to ice skate. They are observed from the West Wing by Forte, a pipe organ who was formerly the Prince's court composer and does not want the spell to break (meaning he never wanted to be human again) as he is of more use in his enchanted form. He sends his piccolo minion, Fife, to sabotage their newfound friendship, causing Belle and the Beast to crash into the snow. Then, when Belle makes a snow angel, the Beast sees his snow figure as a shadow of a monster. He roars, thrashes the snow and storms off in a fit of rage. As Fife claims that Forte will be proud of him, the Beast stomps back into his castle in fury and depression.

Despite the Beast's misgivings, Belle decides to celebrate Christmas without his consent, though the Beast gradually opens up to the idea with advice from Lumiere. Belle meets Forte in the West Wing and he suggests that she venture into the forest to find a Christmas tree, but he secretly tells the Beast that Belle is abandoning him. Forte then continues to manipulate the Beast (under his mind control) into a rage, destroying the Christmas decorations in the dining room and storming off outside to look for Belle. Angelique cries because Forte's mindless slave had destroyed everything, thinking it's hopeless. Belle and a few more servants find and chop the tree down, but Belle falls through thin ice and almost drowns. The Beast intervenes and saves her in time, though he locks her in the dungeon for supposedly breaking her promise not to leave.

As Belle is comforted inside the dungeon by the servants and Fife, who felt guilty for what happened. Forte tempts the Beast to destroy the rose when a petal flutters beside the storybook present Belle left him. The Beast then has a change of heart after reading it makes him realize that all she wants is for him to be happy and let go of the past. He then frees Belle, giving his consent to celebrate his Christmas. Powerless to prevent the inevitable, thinking that when human again he would once more fade into the background, Forte, in a lasting attempt, attempts to use his powers to bring the castle down, thinking that they can't fall in love if they're dead. Fife confronts Forte and it is revealed that the solo Forte promised him was all along blank, even going as far as to tell him that he's second rate and that's all he'll ever be. Beast then storms up to confront Forte, but by then unreasonable to obey him. Belle and the others reach the West Wing where Lumiere, Cogsworth and Angelique try to save the rose, while Belle joins the Beast in confronting Forte. Fife points to the Beast's Forte's keyboard where he clambers up and pulls it away, removing Forte's magic abilities. The Beast violently smashes Forte's keyboard. Forte then tries to pull away from the wall, causing him to come crashing down into the floor, killing him while Belle comforts the devastated Beast. Soon after, the castle is repaired, Fife receives a royal pardon, and Christmas is celebrated.

Back in the present, Mrs. Potts concludes that it was Belle who saved Christmas. Belle and the Prince enter the court to greet their guests, presenting Chip with a storybook as a present. As Fife, now the new court composer, leads the orchestra, the Prince and Belle share a moment on the balcony, where he gives her a rose as a gift.

Cast

 Robby Benson as Prince Adam/Beast
 Paige O'Hara as Belle
 Jerry Orbach as Lumière
 David Ogden Stiers as Cogsworth
 Angela Lansbury as Mrs. Potts
 Haley Joel Osment as Chip.
 Andrew Keenan-Bolger provides his singing voice.
 Bernadette Peters as Angelique
 Paul Reubens as Fife
 Tim Curry as Forte
 Frank Welker as Phillippe the Horse and Sultan
 Jeff Bennett as Axe
 Kath Soucie as The Enchantress
 Rodger Bumpass as additional vocals

Production
In the wake of the success of The Return of Jafar (1994), The Walt Disney Company opened the Walt Disney Animation Canada studios in January 1996 to produce direct-to-video and potential theatrical films, as well as utilize the talent pool of Canadian animators. With 200 animators hired, Disney Animation Canada had two separate animation facilities in Toronto and Vancouver which were supervised by Joan Fischer, a former Canadian public television executive. Their first project was Beauty and the Beast: The Enchanted Christmas, which went into pre-production later that spring. Additional animation work was done by Walt Disney Television Animation Australia, Wang Film Productions Co., Ltd. located in Xindian District, Taipei, Taiwan, and Character Builders. It was Disney's first direct-to-video animated film to use digital ink and paint.

Initially, the film was going to be a direct sequel to the original film with the main villain slated to be Avenant, here depicted as Gaston's younger brother. Avenant's goal was to avenge Gaston by ruining the lives of Belle and the prince and threatening to kill them, reportedly using sorcery to transform the prince back into a Beast and frame Belle for it. Although he was cut out of the story and the plot had changed, these traits were incorporated into Forte, the pipe organ, who did not want the Beast to become human again. Unlike the other characters, Forte was animated entirely by computers.

Incidentally, the antagonist's name "Avenant" was taken from the French 1946 live action black and white film Beauty and the Beast (La Belle et la Bête), being the name of the antagonist of its film. The film is one of the first and most popular adaptations of the story, and have been the most influential on future adaptations, including the original Disney film whose antagonist, Gaston, in fact, was himself inspired by Avenant.

Release
The film was first released on VHS and LaserDisc in the United States and Canada on November 11, 1997.  A bare-bones DVD was released on October 13, 1998. Both editions were quickly taken out of print, and the film remained unavailable until Disney released the Special Edition DVD and VHS on November 12, 2002, just a month after the studio released the original film's Platinum Edition DVD and VHS release. The new DVD featured a remake music video of the song "As Long As There's Christmas" by Play. Also featured was a game titled Forte's Challenge, a 10-minute behind-the-scenes featurette, Disney Song Selection, and Enchanted Environment, where it shows the Beast's Castle during the different seasons.  The original film's Platinum Edition and this film's Special Edition were taken out of print at the same time in January 2003.

The film was released on Blu-ray on November 22, 2011, following the release of the Diamond Edition of the first film on October 5, 2010. In Australia, the film was released on Region 4 DVD on November 3, 2011 with the same features as the original Beauty and the Beast: The Enchanted Christmas DVD. The Blu-ray release was placed into the Disney Vault along with the other two films.

The film was re-released by Walt Disney Studios Home Entertainment on a Blu-ray combo pack on October 25, 2016 — a little over one month after the first film's 25th anniversary Signature Edition was released.

In 2019, the film was released on Disney+.

Reception
Review aggregator website Rotten Tomatoes reported that the film has  "rotten" approval rating with an average rating of 4.1/10, based on  reviews.

Ty Burr, reviewing for Entertainment Weekly, graded the film a C−, concluding in his review, "All in all, a pretty soggy Christmas fruitcake. Will your kids eat it up? Sure, and that makes Enchanted Christmas worth a rental. But Disney really wants you to put this sucker in your permanent collection. And next to Beauty and the Beast — still the company's crown jewel — Christmas looks like a lump of coal."

Accolades

Music

A soundtrack was released on September 9, 1997. The original score and songs were composed by Rachel Portman with lyrics written by Don Black. The film's songs were recorded "live" with an orchestra and the cast in a room, similar to the first film.

"Stories", sung by Paige O'Hara, is about what Belle will give the Beast for a Christmas: a story book, and is heavily based on the motif in the finale of Jean Sibelius' symphony no. 5. "As Long As There's Christmas", the theme of the film, is about finding hope during Christmas Time. The song was sung by the cast of the film with a back-up chorus and is sung when Belle and the enchanted objects redecorate the castle for Christmas. "Don't Fall In Love", sung by Tim Curry, displays Forte's plan on keeping the Beast away from Belle to stop the spell from breaking. "A Cut Above The Rest", also sung by the cast, is about how teamwork and friends are very important in life.

"Deck The Halls" is performed during the opening title by Jerry Orbach, David Ogden Stiers, Bernadette Peters, and the Chorus. Tracks 8 to 15 also act as a Christmas album of traditional carols sung by Paige O'Hara.

See also 
 List of Christmas films

References

External links
 

1997 animated films
1997 films
1997 direct-to-video films
1990s American animated films
1990s Christmas films
1990s children's fantasy films
1997 fantasy films
1990s musical films
American children's animated fantasy films
American children's animated musical films
American Christmas films
American Christmas comedy-drama films
American sequel films
Animated Christmas films
Enchanted Christmas, The
Canadian Christmas films
Canadian animated feature films
Children's Christmas films
Direct-to-video fantasy films
Direct-to-video interquel films
Direct-to-video sequel films
Disney direct-to-video animated films
Films about witchcraft
DisneyToon Studios animated films
Disney Television Animation films
Films about princes
Films based on Beauty and the Beast
Animated films set in France
Films set in castles
Films scored by Rachel Portman
1997 directorial debut films
1990s children's animated films
Frame stories
1990s English-language films
1990s Canadian films